Mera Ghar Meri Jannat is a Pakistani film directed by Hassan Tariq, who also wrote the screenplay, based on a story by Ali Sufiyan Afaqi. It was co-produced by Tariq and Afaqi, and countrywide released on 27 September 1968. The leading cast of the film includes Muhammad Ali, Shamim Ara and Rani.

At annual Nigar Awards, it won two Special Awards for Rani and Baby Jugnu.

Plot 

The plot revolves around a middle-class man who tired of his hard-working life. Her wife often realises him that their house with a little kid is like a heaven for her, but he only craves for a rich lifestyle and want to become wealthy. He gets this chance when a rich man, who looks like him commits suicide. He proves himself to be dead, takes his place and starts living his life.

Cast 

 Muhammad Ali as Nasir/ Qaiser
 Shamim Ara as Najma/ Rozi
 Rani as Mona
 Master Murad as Sajid
 Babay Jugnu
 Meena Shorey
 Ilyas Kashmiri
 Saqi
 Talish (cameo)

Soundtrack 
 Aaja Pyar Ka Hay Zamana, Be-Rukhi Say Dil Na Jala.. – Mala
 Bhula Bhi Day Usay Jo Baat Ho Gei Pyaray.. – Noor Jahan
 Janay Kis Rah Peh Lay Aai Zindagi – Mala
 Maa Keh Kar Kisay Bulaun, Mera Dunya Mein Koi Sahara Nahin – Mala
 Main Nahin Dil Hay Tera, Tu Kabhi Ho Ga Na Mera – Masood Rana
 Mehfil To Ajnabi Thi, Tum Bhi Huay Parayay – Mehdi Hassan
Na Milay Gi Khushi, Hay Yahi Zindagi – Mala
 Thukra Diya Jin Ko Dunya Nay, Ab Kon Hay Un Ka Teray Siwa – Masood Rana, Mala, Azam Chishti

Awards

References

External links 
 

1960s Urdu-language films
Pakistani black-and-white films
Urdu-language Pakistani films